Ivo Jukić (born 13 April 1986) is a Croatian futsal player who played for FC Split Tommy and the Croatia national futsal team. As of 2020, he holds the record as the most capped Croatian futsal player.

References

External links
 UEFA profile
 

1986 births
Living people
Futsal goalkeepers
Croatian men's futsal players